Tolidomordella fenestrata is a species of beetle in the genus Tolidomordella of the family Mordellidae. It was described in 1891.

References

Mordellidae
Beetles described in 1891